A list of animated feature films first released in 1993.

Highest-grossing animated films of the year

See also
 List of animated television series of 1993

References

 Feature films
1993
1993-related lists